Berosus youngi is a species of water scavenger beetle found in the United States.

This species can be distinguished from other members of Berosus in the eastern United States by the somewhat triangular black spots on the sides of the pronotum. Its length has been measured at about 4 mm.

References

Hydrophilinae
Articles created by Qbugbot
Beetles described in 1964